Doug Boyle (born 6 September 1962, Buckhurst Hill, Essex, England) is an English guitarist and composer, best known for his work with Robert Plant, Nigel Kennedy and later incarnations of Caravan.

Boyle's first major break was playing in Robert Plant's band (1987–92). Since 1994, he has played with Nigel Kennedy, while he joined Caravan in 1996. He remained with Caravan until 2007.

In 2010, Boyle released his first solo album, The Third Rail, available from his website. He toured with Nigel Kennedy throughout Europe.

References

External links
 Official website

Canterbury scene
English rock guitarists
English jazz guitarists
English male guitarists
1962 births
Living people
Caravan (band) members
People from Buckhurst Hill